Nansha (p Nánshā,  "Southern Sands") may refer to the following places:

 Nansha District/Nansha New Area in Guangzhou, formed from Panyu District in 2005 and a special development zone established in 2012
 Nansha District, Sansha, located in the Spratly Islands
 Nansha Subdistrict in Guangzhou's Nansha District
 the Nansha Metro Line, properly Line 4, Guangzhou Metro
 Nansha Port in Guangzhou's Nansha District, or S105 Nansha Port Expressway leading to the port

Nansha may also refer to:
 Jiang Tingxi (1669–1732), Chinese painter who used Nansha as one of his pseudonyms
 Adenophora stricta, known in Chinese as "Nansha Ginseng"

See also
 Jiuduansha or Jiangya Nansha, one of the shoals of Jiuduansha off Shanghai in the East China Sea
 Chongming Island#History for Nansha a former island in the Yangtze estuary now forming part of Chongming Island in Shanghai
 Nanshan Island, a member of the Spratlys administered by the Philippines as "Lawak"
 Saori Minami